Henk van der Linden (7 December 1918 – 12 November 1985) was a Dutch footballer. He played in seven matches for the Netherlands national football team from 1946 to 1947.

References

External links
 

1918 births
1985 deaths
Dutch footballers
Netherlands international footballers
Place of birth missing
Association footballers not categorized by position